The 2003 Women's Rugby League World Cup was the second staging of the Women's Rugby League World Cup. The tournament was held in Auckland, New Zealand from 28 September, culminating in the final between New Zealand and New Zealand Maori on 12 October. It was held at North Harbour Stadium and the nearby Marist Rugby ground. Nine teams took part Australia, Great Britain, Tokelau, Tonga, Cook Islands, Niue, Samoa, New Zealand Maori and New Zealand. The initial format was three pools of three, with the top six teams moving into two subsequent pools of three. The top four teams then contested elimination semi-finals.

Teams

Matches
Phase one
The nine teams were grouped into three pools of three. 

Great Britain (two wins) led Samoa (one win) and Tonga in their pool. Australia (two wins) led Māori (one win) and Niue. New Zealand (two wins) led the Cook Islands (one win) and Tokelau. Standinsgs after the first phase were New Zealand (1st, 4 points, +140 differential), Great Britain 4 (2nd, 4, +70), Australia (3rd, 4, +62), New Zealand Māori (4th, 2, +40), Samoa (5th, 2, +24), Cook Islands (6th, 2, -50), Tokelau (7th, 0, -90), Tonga (8th, 0, -94) and Niue (9th, 0, -101).

Phase two
The three teams without a win in the first phase were placed in the same pool. Samoa (5th after phase one) joined Australia (3rd) and New Zealand (1st) in a pool. The other pool included Great Britain (2nd), Māori (4th) and Cook Islands (6th). 

Bowl and Plate Semi-Finals 
The New Zealand - Australia - Samoa phase two pool finished in that order, New Zealand with two wins, Australia one and Samoa nil. 
The other qualifying pool finished with Māori on top with two wins, and Great Britain and Cook Islands drawing their match. Great Britain, who had a better points difference, as well as two wins to one from the phase one pools, advanced to the semi-final. 
In the consolation pool, Niue (one win, one draw) led Tokelau (one win) and Tonga (on draw). 
The Plate and Bowl semi-finals featured Cook Islands, Tokelau, Samoa and Niue. Curiously, the source article in Rugby League Review does not elaborate on why Tonga replaced  Niue in the Bowl Final. However, Niue's point were higher so they stay in Plate category while Tonga went to Bowl 

Bowl Final

Plate Final

Semi-finals

Final

Team of the Tournament  
At the conclusion of the tournament, the Lion Foundation World Cup Team 2003 was announced.

The following staff were also named in the tournament team: Coach: Lawrence Brydon (NZ), Manager: Juanita Woodhouse (NZ), Trainer: Bob Vercoe (NZ)

Luisa Avaiki was named Player of the Tournament.

References

External links

Rugby League World Cups hosted by New Zealand
Women's World Cup
Women's Rugby League World Cup
2003 in New Zealand rugby league
World Cup